The 2009–10 Slovenian PrvaLiga was the 19th season of top-tier football in Slovenia. The season began on 18 July 2009 and ended on 16 May 2010. Koper won the league for the first time.

Teams

Primorje were relegated to the Slovenian Second League after the last-place finish in 2008–09, thus ending their sixteen-year spell in Slovenia's highest division. Drava Ptuj successfully avoided relegation for the second year in a row by beating Second League runners-up Aluminij in the relegation play-offs.

Promoted to the Slovenia's top football league were the Second League champions Olimpija, who were promoted from the lowest tier of Slovenian football to the top league in only four seasons.

Team summaries

League table

Relegation play-offs
The ninth-placed team of PrvaLiga, Interblock, played a two-legged relegation play-off against the runners-up of the 2009–10 Slovenian Second League, Triglav, for a spot in the 2010–11 PrvaLiga.

Triglav Kranj won 4–0 on aggregate.

Results
Every team plays four times against their opponents, twice at home and twice on the road, for a total of 36 matches.

First half of the season

Second half of the season

Top goalscorers
Source: PrvaLiga.si

See also
2009 Slovenian Supercup
2009–10 Slovenian Football Cup
2009–10 Slovenian Second League

References
General

Specific

External links
Official website of the PrvaLiga 

Slovenian PrvaLiga seasons
Slovenia
1